Noemie Fox (born 19 March 1997) is a French-born Australian slalom canoeist who has competed at the international level since 2013.

She won two medals in the C1 team event at the ICF Canoe Slalom World Championships with a gold in 2019 ICF Canoe Slalom World Championships and a silver in 2017 ICF Canoe Slalom World Championships.

Noemie comes from a canoe slalom family with her father being Richard Fox, her mother Myriam Fox-Jerusalmi, her aunt Rachel Crosbee and her older sister Jessica Fox.

World Cup individual podiums

References

External links

Living people
1997 births
Australian female canoeists
Australian people of French-Jewish descent
Jewish Australian sportspeople
Medalists at the ICF Canoe Slalom World Championships
Australian people of English descent